The Cascarots are a Romani-like ethnic group from Spain who settled in parts of the Basque country after the end of the fifteenth century. Cascarots are descendants of marriages between Basques and Romani people.

History

Historic documents mention the Cascarots living in ghettos, for example in Ciboure and occasionally entire villages such as the village of Ispoure.

See also
Romani people by country
Agote, a minority that may be related to Cascarots

References

External links
 

Basque
Romani in France
Labourd
French-Basque people